Paopi 9 - Coptic Calendar - Paopi 11

The tenth day of the Coptic month of Paopi, the second month of the Coptic year. On a common year, this day corresponds to October 7, of the Julian Calendar, and October 20, of the Gregorian Calendar. This day marks the start of the Coptic Season of Peret, the season of the Emergence, during which the flood recedes and the fields are planted. To mark the change of season, the "Litany of the Waters" is replaced by the "Litany of the Plants" in liturgical services.

Commemorations

Saints 

 The martyrdom of Saint Sergius, the friend of Saint Bacchus

Other commemorations 

 The start of the Coptic Season of Peret, the Season of Emergence.

References 

Days of the Coptic calendar